Warner Bros. Games (formerly known as Warner Bros. Interactive Entertainment) is an American video game development and publishing company that is a division of Warner Bros. Entertainment. The company has published numerous video games based on both licensed properties as well as original content. Video games that the company has published include those in the Batman: Arkham, F.E.A.R., Game Party, Mortal Kombat, and Scribblenauts series as well as those based on Warner Bros. films and animations, DC Comics' works, Lego toys, J.R.R. Tolkien's Middle-earth, Harry Potter, and Sesame Street.

List of video games

See also 
 List of Looney Tunes video games
 List of Tiny Toon Adventures video games
 List of Animaniacs video games
 List of video games based on DC Comics
 List of Batman video games
 List of Superman video games
 List of Lego video games
 List of Hanna-Barbera-based video games
 List of Scooby-Doo video games
 List of Tom and Jerry video games
 Harry Potter video games
 Middle-earth in video games
 List of Cartoon Network video games
 Adult Swim Games
 List of games by Midway Games
 List of Mortal Kombat games
 List of Atari, Inc. games
 Sesame Street video games

References 

Warner Bros. Interactive Entertainment

Video Games